Sergei Alexandrovich Frolov  (born June 29, 1974 in Moscow) is a Russian stage, television, and film actor, laureate of the State Prize of the Russian Federation (2003).

Career
Graduated from the music school at the Moscow Conservatory (1991) and acting and directing department of GITIS (1999; Mark Zakharov's course).

He made his debut on the theater stage in Lenkom and worked in this theater for nine years.

He has been acting in films since 1999. In 2004-2005 he was a TV presenter on the Ren TV Channel.

Selected filmography

References

Notes

External links 

1974 births
Living people
Russian male film actors
Russian male stage actors
Russian male television actors
Male actors from Moscow
20th-century Russian male actors
21st-century Russian male actors
State Prize of the Russian Federation laureates
Russian Academy of Theatre Arts alumni
Russian television presenters